Gyriscus asteleformis is a species of sea snail, a marine gastropod mollusk in the family Architectonicidae, known as the staircase shells or sundials.

Distribution
This species is endemic to New Zealand, found between the northern tip of the North Island and the Three Kings Islands.

Habitat
This species is found at depths of about 90 m.

Description
The shell height is up to 8 mm, and the width is up to 7.5 mm.

References 

 Powell A. W. B., New Zealand Mollusca, William Collins Publishers Ltd, Auckland, New Zealand 1979

External links 
 Photo

Architectonicidae
Gastropods of New Zealand
Gastropods described in 1965